Greenideinae is a subfamily of the family Aphididae.

Genera

Tribe: Cervaphidini
Anomalaphis - 
Anomalosiphum -
Brasilaphis - 
Cervaphis -
Meringosiphon -
Sumatraphis

Tribe: Greenideini
Allotrichosiphum -
Eutrichosiphum -
Greenidea -
Greenideoida -
Mesotrichosiphum -
Mollitrichosiphum -
Tritrichosiphum

Tribe: Schoutedeniini
Eonaphis -
Paulianaphis -
Schoutedenia

References

 
Hemiptera subfamilies